Andrés Mendoza may refer to:

Andrés Gerardo Mendoza (born 1995), Mexican football midfielder
Andrés Hurtado de Mendoza, 3rd Marquis of Cañete ( 1500–1561), Spanish military officer and fifth viceroy of Peru
Andrés Mendoza (Peruvian footballer) (born 1978), Peruvian football player
Andrés Mendoza (Ecuadorian footballer) (born 1989), Ecuadorian football player
Andrés Mendoza (Mexican serial killer) (born 1949), Mexican serial killer